I Won't Let You Down may refer to:

"I Won't Let You Down" (Christopher song), 2016 Danish singer Christopher song featuring Bekuh BOOM
"I Won't Let You Down" (Meghan Trainor song), 2016 song by Meghan Trainor from her album Thank You
"I Won't Let You Down" (OK Go song), 2014 song
"I Won't Let You Down" (Ph.D. song), 1982 song 
"I Won't Let You Down" (Jimmy Barnes song), 2019 single by Jimmy Barnes from My Criminal Record
"I Won't Let You Down" (Westlife song), 2003 song by Westlife from Turnaround (Westlife album)